Lovell Minnick Partners is a private equity firm focused on investments in middle market financial and related business services companies in North America and Europe.

History and Structure 
Lovell Minnick was founded in 1999 by financial services executives Jeffrey D. Lovell and James E. Minnick. The firm currently has offices in Philadelphia, Los Angeles and New York.

The firm has raised over $3 billion in committed capital since inception from institutional investors such as public and private pension funds, insurance companies, endowments and foundations. The firm has invested in more than 50 portfolio companies and made over 80 add-on acquisitions in the last 18 years. Some of the firm’s notable previously owned investments include ALPS, J.S. Held, Worldwide Facilities, Duff & Phelps, and AssetMark. More recent investments include SRS Acquiom, Mercer Advisors (which was sold to Oak Hill Capital in 2019), Foreside Financial Group, CenterSquare Investment Management, Tortoise Capital Advisors, and Inside Real Estate.

Senior Leadership

 Jeffrey D. Lovell, Co-Chairman 
 James E. Minnick, Co-Chairman
 Steven C. Pierson, Managing Partner
 Robert M. Belke, Managing Partner
 John D. Cochran, Partner 
 Spencer P. Hoffman, Partner
 Brad Armstrong, Partner
 Jason S. Barg, Partner
 Trevor C. Rich, Partner

Strategy

Lovell Minnick Partners targets portfolio companies across financial services and related business services. Some of the areas of specialization include asset management, wealth management, investment product distribution, specialty finance, insurance brokerage and services, financial and insurance technology, and related business services.

Fund summaries:

External links
 Official website

References

Financial services companies established in 1999
Private equity firms of the United States
American companies established in 1999